Anisosiren was an early sea cow from the Middle Eocene of Hungary.

Location
Fossils of Anisosiren are known from the Eocene deposits in Hungary.

See also 
 Evolution of sirenians

References 

Eocene sirenians
Lutetian life
Eocene mammals of Europe
Fossils of Hungary
Fossil taxa described in 1979
Prehistoric placental genera